Gun control in Italy incorporates the political and regulatory aspects of firearms usage in the country within the framework of the European Union's Firearm Directive. Different types of gun licenses can be obtained from the national police authorities. According to a 2007 study by The Small Arms Survey Project, the per capita gun ownership rate in Italy is around 12% with an estimated 7 million registered firearms in circulation.

General regulations

To legally purchase firearms in Italy, one must either obtain a "purchase authorization" (nulla osta all'acquisto), which allows the holder to purchase and own a firearm but not carry or use it. The same nulla osta is needed to inherit a deceased close relative's firearms: this license is usually temporary and is required to transport the firearms from the relative's house to the new location. 
This kind of authorization is usually valid for 6 months and only for the route needed to change location, from the shop to the detention place. This does not allow to use or carry elsewhere. 
Moreover, a Registration license for "weapon detention" is then required within 72 hours to the nearest police station.

A firearm carrying authorization is needed then, either to carry the firearms around or to move them from a location to another. These Carry licenses (called porto d'armi in Italian) can be for different reasons for sport, personal defence, job occupation (security guard) or hunting.

To obtain either license applicants must be 18 or older, prove they can handle and use a firearm safely (usually by obtaining a certificate from a shooting range after attending a practical shooting course), declare to have a clean criminal record (verification will be made by the Police authorities) and must not be mentally ill or be a known abuser of, or addicted to, alcohol or illegal drugs. Other grounds for refusal of a carry license include being a conscientious objector or living with persons who may gain access to the firearms and abuse them (e.g. living with family members who are mentally ill, alcoholic or drug addicts).

The delegated office to manage, authorize and control over possession is the Questura, the national police provincial office. However, requests can be sent to the Questura also through local Carabinieri stations, where they will provide transmitting all documents to the Questura's "Ufficio porto d'armi" (Firearms carry licenses office).

National Firearms Catalogue

Italian laws prescribed that any rifled-barreled firearm imported or manufactured in Italy after 1976 should have been identified by a progressive catalogue number, assigned by a commission composed of government officials and representatives from the Italian arms industries. The role of the commission was to decide if a rifled firearm should be classified either a war firearm (arma da guerra) or a common firearm (arma comune da sparo). The national firearms catalogue described the characteristics of the weapon (barrel and overall length, number of rounds in the magazine and other technical specifications) that cannot legally be altered without resubmitting the weapon to the commission. Common firearms with certain features (sights, type of action) can be classified as sporting firearms (armi sportive), which can be used for self defence as an extrema ratio (es. during a home invasion) but which can not be carried for said purpose.

The said catalogue and the related commission has been abolished since 2012, due to the economic stability law, approved 12 November 2011; its place has been taken by the Banco Nazionale di Prova (National Proof House) in Gardone Val Trompia, which admits or rejects firearms pending importation, at the same time maintaining an electronic record of the characteristics (long or short firearm, European firearm category, manufacturer, magazine capacity, etc.) of the firearms permitted for sale.

Firearms and ammunition possession
All private firearms must be registered at the local police department within "72 hours", as specified by law, after purchase or transfer, although this limit goes from the time the firearm is actually taken to the place where it is to be registered (for example, the firearm may be bought at a time and withdrawn after a week from the retailer; only then the weapon will require the registration).

Citizens are allowed to own:
 up to three common firearms (usually handguns, but all firearms not using hunting calibers fall into this category, such as 10-gauge shotguns, or some .22 rimfire pistols and rifles);
 up to twelve weapons that have been classified as manufactured for shooting sports by the National Proof House;
 an unlimited number of hunting weapons (both rifles and shotguns);
 up to eight antique or historical weapons (manufactured before 1890);
 unlimited numbers of single shot muzzle loader replicas, for which no registration is needed;
 unlimited numbers of airguns under 7.5 Joules of muzzle energy, specifically approved by the Ministry of Interior, which require no registration as well.

Ammunition is also regulated. While each licensed individual can keep 1500 rounds of hunting ammunition, only 200 rounds of handgun ammunition are allowed. A license to store additional 1500 rounds of pistol ammunition can be obtained, provided specific requirements are met. Ammunition purchases must also be registered.

Trade and ownership of deactivated and replica (non firing) firearms is unrestricted, although every deactivated firearm must be accompanied by a deactivation certificate in conformity to the Italian law.

Firearm collector's license

A Firearm Collector's License allows the bearer to keep at home an unlimited number of weapons, but they usually cannot be used or moved, their ammunition cannot be bought and, if the number of owned weapons is high, the owner may be requested to keep them in a safe room; exact details may vary according to the local police department's policy.

Police forces

National police officers are always allowed to carry their handguns without territorial or time restrictions, but are required to carry them concealed when they are off duty. Submachine guns can only be carried while on duty.
Local police officers are generally allowed to carry their handguns (concealed when off duty), but only within their territorial limits.
The guns carried by police forces are usually the property of the national or local government authority from which they depend; National Police officers are usually assigned a pistol for an indefinite time, while gun assignment specifications for Local Police forces may vary from indefinite to limited, according to local regulations.

Security guards can be allowed by the prefect to carry weapons when on duty and without territorial limits, upon request; usually this permission is granted to cash-in-transit security officers, as well as to private security personnel guarding banks, shopping malls, hospitals and other public facilities.

Public places

In Italy it is illegal to carry weapons in public places, but the law provides the following exceptions:

Hunting license

A hunting license, along with a special hunting permit issued by the region of residence, allows to carry hunting weapons only during the hunting season and only within game preserves. When transporting them outside game reserves, the shotguns must be kept unloaded and locked in their case.

Firearms allowed for hunt are:

 All smooth bore guns, with a gauge not bigger than 12, overall length more than 60 cm and a barrel length more than 30 cm.
 Rifled bore guns, firing a bullet with a diameter more than 5.6mm or a case longer than 40mm, overall length more than 60 cm and a barrel length more than 30 cm.

Shooting sports license

With a shooting sports license, citizens are allowed to transport (unloaded and stored in a proper case) firearms from their home to an authorized shooting range or to another safe place to practice shooting, which, in case of a private place, must be reasonably distant from roads and inhabited areas, and not accessible by unauthorized people. Just like any other gun license, the shooting sports license is valid nationwide: the shooter can thus transport his/her gun anywhere through the national territory, although said guns can only be used in the aforementioned designated places and must never be left unattended during transportation.

Concealed carry license

A concealed carry license allows a citizen to carry a handgun for personal defense; this license is usually much harder to obtain than the other two firearm licenses, must be renewed yearly (while the hunting and shooting sports licences are valid for 6 years), and the applicant has to provide a valid reason to carry a concealed gun (e.g. a salesperson of valuable goods such as jewelry). A special carry license is released to private security personnel; this license differs from the standard carry licenses in that it has to be renewed every two years and a lower tax to pay for the release. Open-carry of handguns is not explicitly forbidden by the law, but it is de facto permitted only to on-duty security personnel.
The prefects, magistrates can buy and carry guns for self-defense without Concealed Carry License.

General limitation to weapons 

Italian weapon and gun laws impose restriction upon kind of firearms, Calibers, and magazine available to civilians, also including limitation to cold weapons, especially in relation to the purpose and place.

Italian laws distinguish weapons into proper and improper weapons, and the first into white weapons and fire weapons. 
 Improper weapons include objects and tools that are not designed to be weapons but can be used as such. Italian law prohibits carrying them in public places, especially hospitals, stadiums, events, squares, and so on. This category also includes pointed and cutting tools) such as screwdrivers, kitchen knives), baseball bats, and golf clubs. Penal sentences exist for forgotten baseball bats and other object forgotten in the trunk. The penal charge is called "unjustified carrying of improper weapon" (Porto abusivo di arma impropria. These regulations also apply, a Sentenced by the Corte di Cassazione, to machetes (considered developed as an agricultural tool), to scuba knives, as it is considered a sport tool, and to many types of knife (the distinguish point for knives is use, purpose and common characteristics with daggers, such as double sharp cutting edge).
 Proper weapons are the most regulated and limited, and are distinguished in cold and fire weapons.
Cold weapons are regulated according to their purpose and can be divided in "subjected to declaration" or "not subjected to declaration". The first category included all weapons (swords, daggers, sabers, battle axes and others) that are sharpened and cannot in any case be brought out of the house when owned. The latter category includes the same weapons that are not sharpened and used as collection, ceremony and so on.
Fire weapons, or firearms, are then regulated in different ways and limited in quantity or usage. Italian gun laws impose restrictions to the kind of firearms, calibers and magazine available to civilians.
 Category A - Prohibited includes all military exploding weapon, automatic firearms, guns disguised as other object (so, never approved by the national commission), exploding, perforing, or incendiary rifles, including any ammunition, expanding bullets, automatic rifles turned into semi-automatic ones. Other limitations apply to number of bullets without recharging, and other technicalities. This category also includes Full-automatic and select-fire firearms (machineguns), grenade launchers, suppressors, destructive devices and all other kinds of military weapons and ammunition, semiautomatic pistols in caliber.
 Category B - Authorization Required includes different kind of Semi-automatic firearms with limited number of bullets or other peculiarities; includes also single-shot rifles and guns.
 Category C - Declaration to authorities Required includes semi-automatic rifles, single or multiple shot long rifles, and other firearms with characteristics and technicalities different from the one in Category B. 
Note that, de facto Category B and Category C have no difference in possession requirement or authorization by authorities, as any unforbidden firearm is subjected to license.

Noise Suppressor are restricted for the civil market, they cannot be imported or fabricated since 2010, but previous sold or imported ones can be detained declaration required. 
5.56×45mm NATO is forbidden but .223 Rem is permitted; 7.62×51mm NATO is forbidden but 308 WIN is permitted.
Magazine alone are not traced nor need to be denounced, but the ones with capacity greater of 20 rounds for pistols or 10 for rifle are specifically regulated and need to be denounced and declared to authorities.
Specific Regulations limits number of ammunition and firearms that can be detained.
Italian regulations also include limitations, requirements and licenses for Pneumatic weapons possession and carrying, specifically when their fire power is higher than 7,5 Joules, as after this limit they are considered full-fledged firearms.

See also 

 List of countries by gun ownership

Notes

References 

Politics of Italy
Firearm laws